Camas Lake is located in Glacier National Park, in the U. S. state of Montana. Camas Lake is a  hike one way from the trailhead along the North Fork Road.

See also
List of lakes in Flathead County, Montana (A-L)

References

Lakes of Glacier National Park (U.S.)
Lakes of Flathead County, Montana